Biliran (IPA: [bɪ'lirɐn]), officially the Municipality of Biliran, is a 5th class municipality in the province of Biliran, Philippines. According to the 2020 census, it has a population of 17,662 people. The town's populace predominantly speaks Waray.

Geography

Biliran serves as the gateway to the Biliran Province. It is situated in the southern part of the province connecting Biliran Island to Leyte via Biliran Bridge. The government is planning to add another bridge parallel to the old bridge for better connectivity.

According to the Philippine Statistics Authority, the municipality has a land area of  constituting  of the  total area of Biliran.

Barangays
Biliran is politically subdivided into 11 barangays.

Climate

Demographics

In the 2020 census, Biliran had a population of 17,662.

Economy

Transportation

Biliran Bridge
Built during the presidency of Marcos, the Biliran Bridge is the only land access to the island of Leyte and throughout the island province. Completed around 1975, This bridge is approximately 150 meters long and its main span is kept in location by an arched steel structure that hovers above a brief and narrow water channel measuring at about 40 meters broad low tide.

References

External links
 
 [ Philippine Standard Geographic Code]
 Municipality of Biliran on Provincial Government of Biliran Website

Municipalities of Biliran